
Gmina Knyszyn is an urban-rural gmina (administrative district) in Mońki County, Podlaskie Voivodeship, in north-eastern Poland.

The gmina contains part of the protected area called Knyszyń Forest Landscape Park.

Villages
Apart from the town of Knyszyn, Gmina Knyszyn contains the villages and settlements of Chobotki, Czechowizna, Grądy, Guzy, Jaskra, Kalinówka Kościelna, Knyszyn-Cisówka, Knyszyn-Zamek, Lewonie, Nowiny Kasjerskie, Nowiny-Zdroje, Ogrodniki, Poniklica, Stoczek, Wodziłówka, Wojtówce and Zofiówka.

Neighbouring gminas
Gmina Knyszyn is bordered by the gminas of Czarna Białostocka, Dobrzyniewo Duże, Jasionówka, Krypno and Mońki.

References

Polish official population figures 2006

Knyszyn
Mońki County